Tağılar (also, Tagilar and Tagylar) is a village and municipality in the Barda Rayon of Azerbaijan.  It has a population of 277.

References

Populated places in Barda District